is a Japanese-Welsh professional darts player, who currently plays in Professional Darts Corporation tournaments. He is also known as a soft tip darts professional. Foulkes was born to a Welsh father, and a Japanese mother. 

Foulkes's main occupation is music, and he is also a restaurant manager. He plays the Japanese folk instrument shamisen and sings.

Foulkes was named after his great-grandfather Hugh Edward Foulkes, a professional football player, who made one appearance for the Wales national team in 1931 while also playing in the Football League. His grandfather, also Hugh Edward Foulkes was also a professional sportsman; a golfer who played at Llandudno golf course.

Darts career
Foulkes began playing darts at the age of 15 at his family-run pub in Okinawa, Japan.

PDC
He won the 2020 Japanese Championship, qualifying him to compete at the 2021 PDC World Darts Championship. He won his first round match at that championship against Mike De Decker with a 3–0 win.

World Championship results

PDC
 2021: Second round (lost to Brendan Dolan 1–3)

References

Living people
1990 births 
Japanese darts players
Welsh darts players
Professional Darts Corporation associate players
Japanese people of Welsh descent